Island Soldier is a 2017 American documentary film written, directed and produced by former Peace Corps volunteer Nathan Fitch. The film deals with problems faced by United States Military families from Kosrae who are citizens of Federated States of Micronesia. Because of a free association agreement called the Compact of Free Association, they can serve, fight and die for the US in Afghanistan and Iraq but they cannot vote.

Release 
After its World Premiere at the Full Frame Film Festival in North Carolina, Island Soldier has screened at film festivals across the USA as well as Canada, the Czech Republic, Germany, Japan and Taiwan.

On Dec 15, 2017, a special screening was presented by the US Department of State and the US Department of the Interior at the Sidney Yates Auditorium in Washington, DC.

On April 4, 2018, a special screening was held on the island of Pohnpei in the Federated States of Micronesia.

On November 14, 2018, the film was broadcast on PBS television and the World Channel as part of the America ReFramed series.

Reception

Critical response 
Island Soldier has not received a rating on review aggregator website Rotten Tomatoes, but it has received mostly enthusiastic reviews.

Sheri Linden of the Hollywood Reporter praised it as "an affecting chronicle of gentle lives and quiet outrage." Jason Sanders, in Filmmaker Magazine, writes that the film "benefits from Fitch’s camerawork, empathy and connection to their subjects, while Bryan Chang’s deft editing does well to underline both Kosrae’s breathtaking natural beauty and its more prosaic, end-of-the road isolation that forces so many of its youth to leave." Sally Round, writing for Radio New Zealand, says the film "brings hope to FSM."

On the negative side, Chad Blair of the Honolulu City Beat criticized the film for asserting "that Micronesians are killed at a higher rate than soldiers born in the 50 states, though the evidence is limited."

Accolades

See also 

 Federated States of Micronesia–United States relations
 Human rights in the Federated States of Micronesia

Further reading 

 A Micronesian Paradise — for U.S. Military Recruiters Time - Dec 31, 2009
 Uncle Sam wants Micronesians for US military Christian Science Monitor - May 5, 2010

References

External links 

 Official site
 
 Island Soldier Movie on Instagram
 Island Soldier Movie on Facebook
 Island Soldier on Twitter
 Official Trailer on Vimeo

Documentary films about war
Documentary films about veterans
American documentary films
2010s English-language films
2010s American films
Films shot in the Federated States of Micronesia
Films set in the Federated States of Micronesia